Frank John Lubin (January 7, 1910 – July 8, 1999) was a Lithuanian-American basketball player. He played college basketball for the UCLA Bruins from 1928 to 1931. In 1997, Lubin was inducted into the UCLA Athletics Hall of Fame. He was also inducted into the Helms Sports Hall of Fame.

Early life
Lubin was born on the east side of Los Angeles, California, to a family of Lithuanian immigrants, and he died in Glendale, California. A veteran with the United States Army Air Forces during World War II, Lubin was buried at Riverside National Cemetery, in Riverside, California. His father, Konstantinas Lubinas, was from Vilkaviškis, while his mother, Paulina Vasiliauskaitė, was from Vabalninkas.

Basketball career

High school
Gangly and uncoordinated, Lubin struggled to improve his game, but was eventually named to the All-City Second Team as a senior in 1927.

College career
While playing college basketball at the University of California, Los Angeles, from 1928 to 1931, Lubin earned All-Pacific Coast Conference honors in his senior season with the Bruins.

U.S. national team
Following his college career, he worked as a stagehand at Twentieth Century Fox, and joined the studio's AAU team, which earned the right to represent the U.S. as part of the first Olympic basketball tournament in 1936, where he won the gold.

Lithuanian national team
During the 1936 Summer Olympics, Lubin was invited to come to Lithuania, and he became their first national team head coach. They won the EuroBasket title in 1937, using American-born players of Lithuanian heritage. When the team hosted the EuroBasket in 1939, they again won the title, this time with Lubin, acting as a player-coach.

When World War II broke out in 1939, Lubin was in Italy, coaching a Lithuanian women's team. Given that Nazi Germany was directly on the path back to Lithuania, Italian officials had to help the team to get back, through train and boat, avoiding Germany. Afterwards, Lubin fled Lithuania to California with his family, in the face of the upcoming Soviet invasion that happened one year later. Lubin continued to play for the Twentieth Century Fox team until 1955, when knee problems prompted him to retire. For his contributions and for introducing the now basketball-mad country of Lithuania to the sport, Lubin is often called the "grandfather of Lithuanian basketball".

See also
 List of FIBA EuroBasket winning head coaches

References
Footnotes

Bibliography
 Vidas Mačiulis, Vytautas Gudelis. Halė, kurioje žaidė Lubinas ir Sabonis. 1939–1989 – Respublikinis sporto kombinatas, Kaunas, 1989

External links
 
 
 Olympic Oral History interview with Frank Lubin (1988)
 Frank Lubin page on Hoopedia.NBA
 Los Angeles Times Interview with Mary Agnes Lubin
 "Captain of the United States Olympic Basketball Team in 1936 was Frank Lubinas" - U.S. Ambassador John A. Cloud

1910 births
1999 deaths
Amateur Athletic Union men's basketball players
American men's basketball players
American people of Lithuanian descent
Basketball players at the 1936 Summer Olympics
Basketball players from Los Angeles
Burials at Riverside National Cemetery
FIBA EuroBasket-winning coaches
FIBA EuroBasket-winning players
Lithuanian men's basketball players
Medalists at the 1936 Summer Olympics
Olympic gold medalists for the United States in basketball
UCLA Bruins men's basketball players
United States men's national basketball team players
Centers (basketball)